The Alliance Party  of Kenya (APK) was a political party in Kenya.

History
The party was established by cabinet minister Kiraitu Murungi in 2012, in an attempt to create a vehicle for Uhuru Kenyatta to use in his bid to succeed President Mwai Kibaki. Kenyatta, however, opted to form his own party, The National Alliance. APK was not formally a part of the Jubilee Alliance, but it did support Kenyatta's bid in the 2013 presidential contest.

In 2016 the party merged into the Jubilee Party.

References

Defunct political parties in Kenya
2012 establishments in Kenya
Political parties established in 2012
2016 disestablishments in Kenya
Political parties disestablished in 2016